Haugeland is a surname. Notable people with the surname include:

 John Haugeland (1945–2010), American professor of philosophy 
 Trygve Haugeland (1914–1988), Norwegian politician